Sugar plantations in the Caribbean were a major part of the economy of the islands in the 18th, 19th, and 20th centuries. Most Caribbean islands were covered with sugar cane fields and mills for refining the crop. The main source of labor, until the abolition of chattel slavery, was enslaved Africans. After the abolition of slavery, indentured laborers from India, China, Portugal and other places were brought to the Caribbean to work in the sugar industry.  These plantations produced 80 to 90 percent of the sugar consumed in Western Europe, later supplanted by European-grown sugar beet.

The sugar trade

Sugar cane development in the Americas
The Portuguese introduced sugar plantations in the 1550s off the coast of their Brazilian settlement colony, located on the island Sao Vincente. As the Portuguese and Spanish maintained a strong colonial presence in the Caribbean, the Iberian Peninsula amassed tremendous wealth from the cultivation of this cash crop. Other imperial states observed the economic boom catalyzed by the plantation system and began colonizing the remaining American territories, hoping to capitalize on the lucrative cultivation and trade of natural resources.

Sugar was the most important crop throughout the Caribbean, although other crops such as coffee, indigo, and rice were also grown. Sugar cane was best grown on relatively flat land near coastal waters, where the soil was naturally yellow and fertile; mountainous parts of the islands were less likely to be used for cane cultivation. The coastal placement of commercial ports gave imperial states a geographic advantage to ship the crop throughout the transatlantic world.

Sugar created a unique political ecology, the relationship between labor, profits, and ecological consequences, in the Caribbean. Imperial powers forcefully displaced west African peoples to cultivate sugar using slave labor. By exploiting labor and the natural world, imperial conflicts arose in the Caribbean vying for political and economic control. For example, conflicts among the English, Spanish, French, Dutch, and various indigenous peoples manifested for territorial gain; regarding the region's political ecology, these European states exploited the environment's resources to such an extent that sugar production began to stagnate. Due to the loss of trees, needed for timber in the sugar refinement process, European imperial powers began competing and fighting over the Caribbean during the middle 17th century. This process would not have been possible without the invention of windmills to produce sugar more efficiently.

Following European settlers’ entry into the Caribbean world, massive demographic changes occurred. Indigenous populations began dying at unprecedented rates due to the influx of old world diseases brought by colonists. Estimates of these population losses vary from 8.4 million to 112.5 million. This extreme diminishment of native populations cleared room for plantation construction and lessened the conflicts between Europeans and indigenous peoples.

Move from South America to the Caribbean
Although the sugar trade in the Americas was initially dominated by the Portuguese Empire, the Dutch–Portuguese War would cause a shift which would have knock-on effects for the further growth of the sugar trade in the Caribbean and particularly the production of rum (made from sugar cane juice). In 1630, the Dutch seized Recife near Pernambuco in what is today Brazil (the Dutch called this New Holland after they took over) and this territory included some sugar plantations worked by African slaves who had been brought to the territory earlier. Some of the slave plantation owners were Cristão-Novo, i.e. "New Christian" Sephardic Jews who had been forced to convert to the Catholic Church. As the Portuguese Inquisition was in operation and the Dutch Calvinists were generally more tolerant of Jews, they were happy to side with them over the Catholic Portuguese and remained in the area operating their substantial sugar-orientated slave plantations, now under Dutch sovereignty. They even founded the first public synagogue in the Americas there in 1636; the Kahal Zur Israel Synagogue.

Further north in the Caribbean, the Protestant Kingdom of England was beginning to challenge the interest of the Catholic powers in the region such as the Spanish Empire and the Kingdom of France, taking control of a number of islands, including Jamaica and Barbados. One of these men, Colonel James Drax who had interests in Barbados, visited Dutch Brazil in 1640 and purchased a triple-roller sugar mill and a set of copper cauldrons (used for turning sugar cane into molasses, i.e. sugar cane juice used in rum production). This technology, although originating in Sicily had spread to the New World and had been improved on by the Sephardim and the Dutch. After 1654, the Portuguese had taken the territory back and pushed the Dutch out of Brazil. Many of the Sephardic Jewish sugar plantation owners fled to English-controlled Barbados, supported by Francis Willoughby and set up the Nidhe Israel Synagogue. In competition with English merchants and due to accusations of favouring the Dutch in the sugar trade (who continued to control Curaçao), Jews were originally not allowed to own more than two slaves in Barbados, but aided the sugar plantations in other ways, bringing their expert knowledge of technologies in cultivating rum from the sugar cane and working as merchants, supplying them with African slaves to work the plantations, helping to make Barbados the sugar capital of the Caribbean and the rum capital of the world. By 1706, the laws against Jews owning sugar plantations in Barbados has been dropped.

During the colonial period, the arrival of sugar culture deeply impacted the society and economy in the Caribbean. It not only dramatically increased the ratio of slaves to free men, but it increased the average size of slave plantations. Early sugar plantations made extensive use of slaves because sugar was considered a cash crop that exhibited economies of scale in cultivation; it was most efficiently grown on large plantations with many workers. People from Africa were imported and made to work on the plantations. For example, prior to 1650 more than three-quarters of the islands' population were of European descent. In 1680, the median size of a plantation in Barbados had increased to about 60 slaves. Over the decades, the sugar plantations began expanding as the transatlantic trade continued to prosper. In 1832, the median-size plantation in Jamaica had about 150 slaves, and nearly one of every four bondsmen lived on units that had at least 250 slaves. For about 100 years, Barbados remained the richest of all the European colonies in the Caribbean region.  The colony's prosperity remained regionally unmatched until sugar cane production expanded in larger colonies, such as Saint-Domingue and Jamaica. As part of the mass sugar industry, sugar cane processing gave rise to related commodities such as rum, molasses, and falernum.

The West India Interest was formed in the 1740s, when the British merchants joined with the West Indian sugar planters. The British and West Indies shared profits and needs. This organization was the first sugar-trading organization which had a large voice in Parliament.

In the 1740s, Jamaica and Saint Domingue (Haiti) became the world's main sugar producers. They increased production in Saint Domingue by using an irrigation system that French engineers built. The engineers also built reservoirs, diversion dams, levees, aqueducts, and canals. In addition, they improved their mills and used varieties of cane and grasses.

19th century
According to a 2021 study, "historical property rights institutions [in Haiti] created high transaction costs for converting land to cane production", relative to the other Caribbean countries. As a result, Haiti lost its place as the leading sugar producer in the world.

After the end of slavery in Saint Domingue at the turn of the 19th century, with the Haitian Revolution, Cuba became the most substantial sugar plantation colony in the Caribbean, outperforming the British islands.

In the 19th century, sugar dominated Martinique, Grenada, Jamaica, Saint Croix, Barbados, the Leeward Islands, Saint Domingue, Cuba, as well as many other islands that had been run by French, British, or Spanish owners. During the late 19th and 20th centuries, the sugar cane industry came to dominate Puerto Rico's economy, both under the colonial rule of Spain and under the United States.

After slavery, sugar plantations used a variety of forms of labour including workers imported from colonial India and Southern China working as indentured servants on European owned plantations (coolie). In the 20th century, large-scale sugar production using wage labour continued in many parts of the region.

Slavery on Caribbean sugar plantations 
The Europeans forced the indigenous peoples of various Caribbean islands to provide the physical labor necessary for the production of sugarcane. The indigenous populations of the Caribbean were decimated by illness after initial colonization and were left with few numbers. In order to continue production for the crop, Europeans introduced African slaves to the island through the Trans-Atlantic slave trade. The time at which this happened varies from island to island.

Sugarcane harvesting during the time of colonization in the Caribbean was a labor intensive process. Firstly, it was harvested by hand, and the sucrose inside needed to be harvested quickly to not be spoiled. To extract the juice, it must be chopped, ground, pressed, pounded, or soaked in liquid before it is heated. Once heated, the liquids evaporate until only the crystals remain. Each step is labor-intensive and requires technical knowledge and skill. These tasks were preformed by enslaved individuals until emancipation.

In 1807, Parliament passed the Slave Trade Act, prohibiting the trade of slaves in the British Empire. This act extended to the Caribbean plantations under British control. Without the labor influx of slaves through the Trans-Atlantic slave trade, the system became harder to maintain. Years later, in 1838, more than half a million people in the Caribbean were emancipated from slavery as a result of the 1833 Emancipation Bill.

Environmental impact 
The sugar cane industry had an adverse impact on the environment as this industry grew in Caribbean countries. These included the destruction of forests, water pollution, and loss of fertility and erosion of soils. These problems were seen on various different scales in the Dominican Republic in the 16th century; the Lesser Antilles in the 17th century; Jamaica and Haiti in the 18th century; and Cuba and Puerto Rico in the 19th century.

In 1492, Christopher Columbus arrived on the northern coast of Hispaniola and Spanish colonization began to establish itself. By the late 16th century, demand and production for sugar, one of the central exports of the island, had increased. Much of the indigenous population suffered from disease and famine, and many pre-colonial smaller-scale farms were replaced by larger-scale farms. These farms required more land and moist soil close to water sources, resulting in deforestation and water pollution.

During the 17th century in the Lesser Antilles, many of the islands in the Lesser Antilles suffered ecological losses after the introduction of monoculture for sugar plantations. On the Caribbean island Nevis in particular, the island was nearly deforested during the mid-1600s and much of the topsoil quality deteriorated as a result of a large influx of plantations.

Although these nations have taken measures to mitigate the impacts of the sugar revolution, in some there are still traces of what the environmental historian of the Caribbean and Latin America, Reinaldo Funes Monzote, describes as a "serious deterioration" of the natural environment, with  socio-economic consequences.

The impacts concerning irrigation and pollution of water runoff are seen as the most profound issues in sugar cane cultivation.

See also
Trapiche, a mill used for sugar cane
Colonial molasses trade
Casa-grande in Brazil
Sugar production in the Danish West Indies
Slavery in the British and French Caribbean
Valle de los Ingenios - Valley of the Sugar Mills, Cuba
Amazon rubber boom
Coffee production in Brazil
West India Interest
London Society of West India Planters and Merchants
Centre for the Study of the Legacies of British Slave-ownership

References

Bibliography

 
 
 
 
 
 
 
 
 
 
 
 
 
 
 
 
 

 
Agriculture in the Caribbean
Economic history of the Caribbean
 Caribbean
West Indies